Vasantrao Gite is an Indian politician and member of the Shiv Sena. Gite was a member of the Maharashtra Legislative Assembly from the Nashik Central constituency in Nashik district as a member of Maharashtra Navnirman Sena.

References 

People from Nashik
Maharashtra Navnirman Sena politicians
Shiv Sena politicians
Bharatiya Janata Party politicians from Maharashtra
Members of the Maharashtra Legislative Assembly
Mayors of places in Maharashtra
Nashik municipal councillors
Living people
Marathi politicians
21st-century Indian politicians
Year of birth missing (living people)